Zeta Beta Tau is a fraternity at American universities. Until 1954 its membership was exclusively Jewish.

References

External links
 
 
 ZBT Expansion Update

Zeta Beta Tau
brothers